The 2020 Guangzhou Charge season was the second season of Guangzhou Charge's existence in the Overwatch League. The Charge planned to hold a league-high five homestands in the 2020 season; the firth three homestands were to be held at be held at the Foshan International Sports and Cultural Center, with the final two at Tianhe Gymnasium. However, due to the COVID-19 pandemic, all homestand events were cancelled.

Preceding offseason

Roster changes 

The Charge enter the new season with three free agents, six players which they have the option to retain for another year, and two players under contract. The OWL's deadline to exercise a team option is November 11, after which any players not retained will become a free agent. Free agency officially began on October 7.

On November 11, the Charge announced the departure of several players. The team did not re-sign free agents Choi "HOTBA" Hong-jun, Joona "fragi" Laine, and Kim "Bischu" Hyung-seok. Additionally, they released Lizhen "OnlyWish" Chen, and Lee "Rise" Won-jae retired from professional Overwatch. The Charge's first acquisitions of the season were announced on November 14 with the signings of former Philadelphia Fusion support Alberto "neptuNo" González and off-tank Nam "Cr0ng" Ki-cheol, along with the promotion of Qi "Wya" Haomiao from their academy team T1w.GZA.

Organizational changes 
On October 30, the Charge announced that they had parted ways with assistant coach Rohit "Curryshot" Nathani.

Homestand events 
In August 2019, the Charge announced that they would hold a league-high five homestand events; the events would take place at Tianhe Gymnasium and the Foshan International Sports and Cultural Center. Due to the COVID-19 pandemic, the Charge decided to relocate their team to South Korea with no specific return time. Additionally, the league cancelled all February and March matches planned in China, which cancelled the Charge's first three homestands; all were to at the Foshan International Sports and Cultural Center from February 22 to 23, March 14 to 15, and March 21 to 22. The Overwatch League announced that the cancelled homestand events in China would be rescheduled for Weeks 5 through 7 in a studio in Seoul, South Korea; however, due to the COVID-19 pandemic in South Korea, these matches were cancelled as well.

Roster

Standings

Game log

Regular season

Midseason tournaments 

| style="text-align:center;" | Bonus wins awarded: 4

Postseason

References 

Guangzhou Charge
Guangzhou Charge
Guangzhou Charge seasons